The St. Helena Sound Heritage Preserve is a collection of Sea Islands totaling  of upland and wetland property located along the Saint Helena Sound in the Lowcountry region of South Carolina.  Owned and managed by the South Carolina Department of Natural Resources (SCDNR), the preserve is also considered to be a designated Wildlife Management Area and a portion of the ACE Basin area.  Listed below are properties that consist of the preserve:

 Otter Island
 Ashe Island
 Beet Island
 Big/Warren Islands (()
 South Williman Island (()

See also
 ACE Basin
 ACE Basin NERR
 Saint Helena Sound

External links
 St. Helena Sound Heritage Preserve (SCDNR website)

Protected areas of Beaufort County, South Carolina
Protected areas of Colleton County, South Carolina
Wildlife management areas of South Carolina